Mortimer Henri-Robert Fournier-Sarlovèze (January 14, 1869 – July 13, 1937) was a French politician and polo player in the 1900 Summer Olympics. He was born in Paris and died in Compiègne. In 1900 he was part of the Bagatelle Polo Club de Paris polo team which won the bronze medal.

References

External links

1869 births
1937 deaths
Politicians of the French Third Republic
French polo players
Olympic polo players of France
Polo players at the 1900 Summer Olympics
Olympic bronze medalists for France
Medalists at the 1900 Summer Olympics
Olympic medalists in polo